Antonio Giordano (Napoli, 11 Ottobre 1962) is an oncologist, pathologist, geneticist, researcher, university professor and writer. An naturalized American from Italy, he is the Director of the Sbarro Institute for Cancer Research and Molecular Medicine in Philadelphia, and a professor of Anatomy and Pathological Histology at the Department of Medical Biotechnology of the University of Siena.  He discovered some key factors in the regulation of the cell cycle and of mechanisms linked to the onset of tumors. In particular, he distinguished himself for having isolated the tumor suppressor gene, the RB2/p130, subsequently demonstrating how the same gene, introduced through a retrovirus in some animal models, is able to reduce the growth of tumors. In addition to his career as a researcher he also distills science for a popular audience, mostly concerning cancer risk in the Campania Region, and its relation to toxic waste.

Biography 
Antonio Giordano is the son of Giovan Giacomo Giordano (Corbara 1925 - 2010), oncologist and pathologist of Maria Teresa Sgambati. He graduated with full marks in Medicine at the University of Naples in 1986. He obtained a specialization in Anatomy and Pathological Histology at the University of Trieste. He later moved to the United States for a PhD, where he was a student of Nobel Prize James Dewey Watson at Cold Spring Harbor Laboratory. During his years there, he discovered the direct link between cell cycle regulation and the development of cancer. Demonstrating that for normal cells to transform into neoplastic, oncogenes must interact directly with cyclins, determining a deregulation of the cell cycle and therefore, onset of the neoplastic phenotype. In 1992, he moved to Philadelphia, where he held the position of assistant professor at Temple University and then at Thomas Jefferson University. Since 2004, Giordano has been a full-time professor of Anatomy and Pathological Histology at the University of Siena and currently holds the position of director of the Sbarro Institute for Cancer Research and Molecular Medicine and of the Center for Biotechnology in the College of Science and Technology at Temple University.

Relations with Italy 
Since June 2006 for some years, he has been president of the Scientific Committee of the Human Health Foundation Olus and president of the scientific committee for CROM (Oncological Research Center of Mercogliano-AV). There are also several collaborations with Italian universities, such as the Universities of Rome, Naples, Palermo, Messina, Sassari.

Main scientific discoveries 
In 1993, Antonio Giordano identified and cloned a new tumor suppressor gene, RB2 / p130, which has a primary function in the cell cycle by controlling correct DNA replication and essentially preventing the onset of cancer. The alterations, at the level of these tumor suppressor genes, that is their non-expression or a malfunction, allow the neoplastic cells to multiply in an uncontrolled way. In the year 2000, a study of great international scientific impact on lung cancer was completed. The absolute novelty consists in the first example of setting up a gene therapy model that is tested in vivo on the guinea pig animal (mouse) in which a lung tumor was induced. Using the functionally active RB2 / p130 gene, as a vector, a retrovirus, and tumor growth has been shown to be drastically reduced after a single injection of RB2 / p130.  In 2001, another study examined a topic of great relevance and scientific relevance. The results of this study have opened the doors to a very suggestive key to interpreting tumor pathogenesis. The experiments are always carried out on the animal (mouse) show, in fact, how RB2 / p130 can also work as an inhibitor of angiogenesis (the neoformation of vessels which, feeding the tumor, is the basis of neoplastic growth). In addition to RB2 / p130, Prof. Giordano has discovered two important "guardians" of the human genome CDK9 and CDK10 The results obtained by prof. Giordano with these studies have had a wide echo in the international press, as they open up important perspectives in the field of cancer treatment, allow us to glimpse completely new application possibilities compared to traditional surgical and chemotherapeutic treatments. In 2004 Giordano discovered NSPs (Novel Structure Proteins), a new protein structure with a potential role in the dynamics of the nucleus during cell division. One protein in particular (Isoform NSP5a3a) is highly expressed in the cell lines of some tumors and could be a very useful tumor marker.

Health and environment 
In recent years, Giordano has dedicated numerous efforts to studying the relationship between cancer and environmental pollution in the Italian region of Campania, linking his career as a researcher to that of a science communicator. He was among the first to report an increased incidence of various types of cancer in populations near illegal toxic waste sites. Not only has he published scientific articles on this subject, but he has also committed himself to making these data known through two books on the subject, respectively "Campania, latera di Velini" and "Munizza di stator"  edited by Denaro Libri and Minerva respectively. It also launched a petition to protect the environment, signed by over 500 researchers and people from various professional sectors. He has also been the promoter of numerous non-profit initiatives aimed at safeguarding the environment and human health (for more information on Antonio Giordano's contribution to the topic of Health and Environment, also read his interview with Italian scientists and scientists from North America Foundation). Recently, as evidence of his commitment in this direction, Giordano was appointed Technical Consultant of the Public Prosecutor's Office of Avellino for the Iso Chimica case and Scientific Director of the Mediterranea - Food and Wine Academy of Naples. He has carried out some scientific studies highlighting the anticancer properties of tomato. Most recently he was the author and promoter of the Veritas study, a pilot study aimed at clarifying the link between the onset of diseases and exposure to environmental pollutants.

Publications 
Giordano is the author of over 600 scientific publications on peer-reviewed journals and holds numerous international patents relating to the discovery of new genes and new methods for the diagnosis and treatment of cancer.

 Campania, terra Dei Velini, Giulio Taro (coautore), Napoli, Denaro Libri, 2011, . - Libro Bianco
 Munizza di Stato. Le Terre Dei Fouche Nell 'Italia Dei Velini, Paolo Chiariello (couture), Bologna, Minerva     Edizioni,2015, . - Libro itchiest

Awards and recognition 
 Cavaliere dell'Ordine al Merito Della Repubblica Italian (Italia) 2001

 Commendatore dell'Ordine al Merito Della Repubblica Italian (Italia) 2010
 Croce al Merito Meli tense, onorificenza del Soprano Militar Ordines di Malta

References 

1962 births
Living people
Italian oncologists
University of Naples Federico II alumni
University of Trieste alumni